Barnbougle Dunes Golf Links is a golf course located near the seaside village of Bridport in Tasmania's North-East.  The 18 hole championship layout was designed by course architects Tom Doak and Mike Clayton, and is set among sand dunes overlooking Bass Strait.  The course has been highly rated since opening in 2005, recognised as Australia's number one public access course, and fifth best course of any sort in Australia.  Barnbougle Dunes is the first new Australian course to enter the World's Top 100 courses since rankings began, coming in at 49 after its first appraisal. It has since improved to be ranked the 35th best course in the world, and is ranked the 12th best links course in the world.

Golf Odyssey, the preeminent newsletter devoted to golf travel, called Barnbougle Dunes "a piece of golfing heaven," following its January 2007 review.

Golfing tragic Greg Ramsay dreamed up the idea of building the course, and tourism entrepreneur and farmer Richard Sattler developed the concept with Ramsay, Doak and well known Melbourne golf identity Mike Clayton.  The layout is not long, but certainly presents a tough assignment, particularly when the wind is blowing hard, as it often does in this part of Tasmania.

Currently there are 22 accommodation villas on-site, as well as a restaurant and conference facility perched on the dunes, looking north over the Strait.  The Barnbougle Bus offers a transfer service from the city of Launceston – around one hour from Bridport – the nearest major airport offering regular commercial airline flights from mainland Australia.

References

External links
 
 Course Review
 Barnbougle Dunes Golf Club Profile, Golf Australia

2005 establishments in Australia
Sports clubs established in 2005
Sports venues completed in 2005
Golf clubs and courses in Tasmania